Cecil Andrews College is a public co-educational high day school, located on Seville Drive in the suburb of Seville Grove near Armadale, part of the metropolitan area of Perth, Western Australia.

Formerly known as West Armadale High School and Cecil Andrews Senior High School, it was established in 1980 and caters to students from Year 7 to Year 12.

Overview 
The school is named after Cecil Rollo Payton Andrews, an Inspector General of Schools in Western Australia from 1903 to 1912 and Director of Education of the WA Department of Education from 1912 to 1930. The school was renamed in Andrews' honour through the efforts of its foundation principal, Howard Rintoul.

Richard Hunter was the principal until 2013 when Stella (Ballae) Jinman became principal. The school changed its name from Cecil Andrews Senior High School to Cecil Andrews College in 2017.

See also

List of schools in the Perth metropolitan area

References

External links
  Cecil Andrews College

Educational institutions established in 1980
Public high schools in Perth, Western Australia
1980 establishments in Australia